John Dorsett House (also known as Tiny House) is a historic building in Savannah, Georgia, United States. It is located at 536 East State Street, in the northeastern tything of Greene Square, and was built in 1845 for New York City-born shipbuilder John W. Dorsett by Dix Fletcher. The city's smallest free-standing house, it was moved from 422 Hull Street, in Savannah's Crawford Ward, in the mid-20th century. The structure is part of Savannah's Historic District.

Dorsett was the father of Charles H. Dorsett, president of Savannah's Peoples Savings and Loan Company. He was married, from 1838 to his death (around 1845), to Sarah R. (Fletcher). John died when his son was eleven months old.

See also
Buildings in Savannah Historic District

References

External links
The house's original location, now a parking lot – Google Street View, January 2019

Houses in Savannah, Georgia
Houses completed in 1845
Relocated houses
Greene Square (Savannah) buildings
Savannah Historic District